Zaira Bas Gomis (born 1994) is a Spanish beauty queen who captured the crown of Miss Earth Spain 2014 and was a top 8 semifinalist in Miss Earth 2014. Zaira is the second Spanish delegate to finish a Top 8 placement after Adriana Reverón in 2008.

Pageantry

Miss Earth Spain 2014
Zaira joined Miss Earth Spain 2014 and represented the capital city, Madrid. She won the "Best in Swimsuit" round. 

At the conclusion of the pageant, Zaira was proclaimed as the winner. Her elemental court (runners-up) is composed of Selena Lugo, who represented Canarias, as Miss Earth Spain - Air, Enerits Peña of País Vasco as Miss Earth Spain - Water and Tamara Moreno from  Córdoba was declared as Miss Earth Spain - Fire.

Miss Earth 2014

By winning Miss Earth Spain, Gomis flew to the Philippines in November to compete with almost 100 other candidates to be Alyz Henrich's successor as Miss Earth.

During the entire run of the pre-pageant activities, Zaira was able to capture some awards. Her awards include both gold medal for "Resort Wear Competition" and "Swimsuit Competition" each, a silver medal for "Evening Gown Competition", a bronze medal for "National Costume Competition" for Europe. She was also able to get two awards from Sponsors - "Miss Phoenix Petroleum" and "Miss Ever Bilena" awards.

At the conclusion of the pageant, she finished as one of the Top eight finalists. The Miss Earth 2014 title was won by Jamie Herrell of the Philippines.

References

External links
Zaira at Miss Earth official website

Living people
People from Valencia
Miss Earth 2014 contestants
Spanish beauty pageant winners
1994 births